Rue de Rivoli (English: "Rivoli Street") is a street in central Paris, France. It is a commercial street whose shops include leading fashionable brands. It bears the name of Napoleon's early victory against the Austrian army, at the Battle of Rivoli, fought on 14–15 January 1797. Developed by Napoleon through the heart of the city, it includes on one side the north wing of the Louvre Palace and the Tuileries Gardens.

History
The Rue de Rivoli is an example of a transitional compromise between an environment of prestigious monuments and aristocratic squares, and the results of modern town-planning by municipal authorities.

The new street that Napoleon developed through the heart of Paris includes on one side the north wing of the Louvre Palace, (which Napoleon extended) and the Tuileries Gardens. Upon completion, it was the first time that a wide, well designed and aesthetically pleasing street bound the north wing of the Louvre Palace. Napoleon's original section of the street opened up eastward from the Place de la Concorde. Builders on the north side of the Place Louis XV, (as it then was named) between the Rue de Mondovi and Rue Saint-Florentin, had been constrained by letters patent in 1757 and 1758 to follow a single façade plan. The result was a pleasing uniformity, and Napoleon's planners extended a similar program, which resulted in the arcades and facades that extend for almost a mile along the street.

The restored Bourbon King Charles X continued the Rue de Rivoli eastwards from the Louvre, as did King Louis-Philippe. Finally, Emperor Napoleon III extended it into the 17th-century quarter of Le Marais (see: Right Bank). Beneath the Rue de Rivoli runs one of the main brick-vaulted, oval-sectioned sewers of Paris' much-imitated system, with its sidewalks for the sewer workers.

In 1852, opposite the wing of the Louvre, Baron Haussmann enlarged the Place du Palais-Royal that is centred on the baroque Palais Royal, built for Cardinal Richelieu in 1624 and willed to the royal family, with its garden surrounded by fashionable commercial arcades. At the rear of the garden is the older branch of the Bibliothèque Nationale, in the Rue Richelieu.

North of the Rue de Rivoli, at the point where the Grands Boulevards crossed an enormous new square, the new opera house was built. The Opera Garnier is a monument to the construction of the Second Empire. Just behind the opera house can be found the largest department stores, such as the Galeries Lafayette and Printemps.

East along the Rue de Rivoli, at the Place des Pyramides, is the gilded statue of Joan of Arc, situated close to where she was wounded at the Saint-Honoré Gate in her unsuccessful attack on English-held Paris, on September 8, 1429. A little further along, towards the Place de la Concorde, the Rue de Castiglione leads to the Place Vendôme, with its Vendôme Column surmounted by the effigy of Napoleon Bonaparte. He began the building of the street in 1802; it was completed in 1865. A plaque at no. 144 commemorates the assassination there of the Huguenot leader Admiral Gaspard II de Coligny, in the St. Bartholomew's Day massacre of 1572.

In April 2020 the Mayor of Paris announced that cars would be banned throughout summer 2020, suggesting the ban could be made permanent. This is part of the ongoing measures to reduce car use within Paris.

See also
 Rue des Archives, an adjoining street to the north

References

External links

WebMuseum Paris History: Rue de Rivoli

1848 establishments in France
Shopping districts and streets in France
Streets in the 1st arrondissement of Paris
Streets in the 4th arrondissement of Paris
Le Marais